Adorcelino Wesley Gomes da Silva aka Tuta (born March 17, 1984) is a Brazilian right full back playing for APOP Kinyras Peyias in the League Marfin Laiki. He started his career in Brasil, at Santos FC.

In July 2006, Tuta moved to Greece to play for Aris Thessaloniki F.C. in the Greek Super League.

References

External links

Profile at Insports.gr

1984 births
Living people
Brazilian footballers
Aris Thessaloniki F.C. players
Grêmio Foot-Ball Porto Alegrense players
Santos FC players
APOP Kinyras FC players
Super League Greece players
Cypriot First Division players
Brazilian expatriate footballers
Expatriate footballers in Cyprus
Expatriate footballers in Greece
Association football midfielders